Gāh is a period of time which is dedicated to a Yazata in Zoroastrianism.

References

Bibliography
  (note to catalogue searchers: the spine of this edition misprints the title "Zoroastrians" as "Zoroastians", and this may lead to catalogue errors)

Zoroastrianism
Persian words and phrases